Sir Thomas Cave, 5th Baronet (27 May 1712 – 7 August 1778) was a British politician and lawyer.

Background
Baptised at St Martin-in-the-Fields Church in Covent Garden, he was the second son of Sir Thomas Cave, 3rd Baronet and his wife Hon. Margaret Verney, daughter of John Verney, 1st Viscount Fermanagh. Cave was educated at Rugby School and then at Balliol College, Oxford. In 1734, he succeeded his older brother Verney as baronet. Cave was called to the bar by the Inner Temple in the following year and he received an honorary degree of Doctor of Civil Law by the University of Oxford in 1756.

Career
Cave entered the British House of Commons in 1741, sitting as a Member of Parliament (MP) for Leicestershire until 1747. He was again successful in 1762 and represented the constituency until his withdrawal from politics in 1774, because of ill health.

Family
He married Elizabeth Davies, daughter of Griffith Davies in November 1735 and had by her six daughters and two sons. Among them were:

 Sir Thomas Cave, 6th Baronet (22 August 1737 – 30 May 1780). He married Sarah Edwards. They had one son who succeeded him, Thomas, 7th Baronet and a daughter Sarah, Baroness Braye.
 Rev. Sir Charles Cave, 8th Baronet (c. 1747–1810). He was never married.
 Margaret Cave
 Elizabeth Cave, married as his fourth wife, Bennet Sherard, 3rd Earl of Harborough. They had no issue.

Cave died, aged 66 and was buried at Stanford, Northamptonshire. He was succeeded in the baronetcy by his oldest son Thomas.

References

1712 births
1778 deaths
Alumni of Balliol College, Oxford
Baronets in the Baronetage of England
British MPs 1741–1747
British MPs 1761–1768
British MPs 1768–1774
Members of the Inner Temple
Members of the Parliament of Great Britain for Leicestershire
People educated at Rugby School
People from Covent Garden
People from Northamptonshire